De Película is the ninth studio album by Mexican singer Gloria Trevi. It was released on 24 September 2013 through Universal Music Group. The album produced five singles, two of which were used in Trevi's 2012 telenovela Libre Para Amarte.

Track listing

Charts and certifications

Weekly sales

Certifications

Release
 Standard version

References

2013 albums
Gloria Trevi albums
Spanish-language albums